Wilbraham & Monson Academy (WMA) is a college-preparatory school located in Wilbraham, Massachusetts. Founded in 1804, it is a four-year boarding and day high school for students in grades 9-12 and postgraduate. A middle school, with grades 6–8, offers boarding for grade 8 students.

WMA was established by the merger of two 19th-century academies — Monson Academy, founded in 1804, and Wesleyan Academy, founded in 1817 in New Market, New Hampshire. Wesleyan Academy relocated to Wilbraham in 1825 and was renamed Wilbraham Academy in 1917. In 1971, when the school merged with Monson Academy, the name was officially changed to Wilbraham & Monson Academy. Wesleyan was the first coeducational boarding school in the country, and Monson Academy became the first to enroll Chinese students in 1847.

Academics

Faculty

WMA is led by 66 faculty members, 44 of whom live on campus and 70 percent who have advanced degrees. The program features small classes (6:1 student/teacher ratio) and 23 AP courses. WMA's Middle School includes 64 students and has an average class size of eight.

Athletics

Athletics include rugby, lacrosse, baseball, cross country, dance, wrestling, soccer, tennis, golf, football, ice hockey, basketball, track, riflery, volleyball, softball, water polo and swimming.

In fall 2007, the Academy unveiled its $4 million expansion of the Greenhalgh Athletic Center on campus. The expansion included a fitness room, a multi-purpose dance and wrestling space, a large conference room and new central locker facilities. A turf field and new tennis courts are among improvements to campus facilities during the last decade. WMA has 29 varsity athletic teams, and 18 others that compete at the non-varsity level.

Notable alumni
 Henry Barnard, educationalist
 Alfred Ely Beach, inventor, publisher, and patent lawyer
 Rick Bennett, ice hockey player and coach
 Mary Ann Booth, microscopist
 Tyrell Burgess, professional soccer player with Vancouver Whitecaps FC
 Kraisak Choonhavan, member of Thailand Senate for Nakhon Ratchasima Province (2000–2006); former chairman of the Thai Senate's Foreign Relations Committee
 Russell H. Conwell, minister and founder of Temple University - 1859
 Winthrop Murray Crane, Associate Justice of the United States Supreme Court, 1870–1880
 Emily Norcross Dickinson, mother of 19th-century poet Emily Dickinson
 Richard Fuld, former CEO Lehman Brothers
 Wenyen Gabriel, NBA basketball player for the New Orleans Pelicans
 Bill Guerin, retired NHL hockey player; general manager of Minnesota Wild; four-time Stanley Cup champion
 William Stewart Halstead, pioneering American surgeon, studied at Monson Academy for a time
 Ratcliffe Hicks, Connecticut state legislator, industrialist, lawyer, and benefactor of the University of Connecticut
 Kim Hyun-jong, South Korean trade minister under Moon Jae-in and Roh Moo-hyun
 Galway Kinnell, poet
 Christine Ladd-Franklin, mathematician, logician and psychologist - 1865
 Patrick Mazeika (born 1993), baseball player
 Pat Phelan, professional soccer player for the New England Revolution
 Nitya Pibulsonggram, Thai Ambassador to the US (1996–2000), Foreign Minister of Thailand (2006–2008)
 Humphrey Pickard, first president of Mount Allison University
 Charles Pratt, oil tycoon and founder of the Pratt Institute
 Joey Santiago, band member of the Pixies
 Pote Sarasin, Prime Minister of Thailand (1957) secretary-general of SEATO (1958–1964)
 Lucy Stone, orator, abolitionist, suffragist, and women's rights advocate
 William Strong, governor of the Commonwealth 1900–1902
 Yung Wing, first Chinese graduate of an American university (Yale) - 1854

See also
 Wilbraham Wesleyan Academy

References

Further reading

External links
Wilbraham & Monson Academy Website

1804 establishments in Massachusetts
Boarding schools in Massachusetts
Co-educational boarding schools
Educational institutions established in 1804
Middle schools in Massachusetts
Private high schools in Massachusetts
Private middle schools in Massachusetts
Private preparatory schools in Massachusetts
Schools in Hampden County, Massachusetts